Ghazar is an Armenian given name. Notable people with the name include:

 Ghazar Parpetsi, 5th to 6th century Armenian chronicler and historian
 Ghazar Artsatagortsian, Russian Navy Admiral of Armenian descent

See also 
 Ghazaros
 Gazar

Armenian masculine given names